The 2011–12 Boston College Eagles men's basketball team represented Boston College in the 2011–12 NCAA Division I men's basketball season.  The Eagles were led by second-year head coach Steve Donahue.  The team played its home games at Conte Forum on the campus of Boston College in Chestnut Hill, Massachusetts.  Boston College competed in the Atlantic Coast Conference.

Recruiting

Roster

Schedule and results 
The ACC had games on multiple media broadcasts on the ESPN family of networks, including ESPN3 exclusives for non-conference games, on the ACC Regional Sports Network (also called RSN-, found on FSN affiliates for most of the country), and with Raycom Sports ACC Network. For Boston College games done by RSN, would air on NESN. Games that aired on the ACC Network would air on TV–38 WSBK-TV.

|-
!colspan=9| Exhibition

|-
!colspan=9| Regular season

|-
!colspan=9|2012 ACC tournament

References

Boston College
Boston College Eagles men's basketball seasons
Boston College Eagles men's basketball
Boston College Eagles men's basketball
Boston College Eagles men's basketball
Boston College Eagles men's basketball